Gorafe is a municipality in the province of Granada, Spain. As of 2010, it has a population of 474 inhabitants.  It has interesting megalithic structures in the area of unknown origin.

References

Municipalities in the Province of Granada